Theogonia (Greek for "Theogony") is the ninth full-length album by Greek extreme metal band Rotting Christ. It is their first release through Season of Mist, and the first to feature guitarist Giorgos Bokos (Nightfall) in the line-up.

The album includes a special edition DVD with 2005–2006 tour footage of the band in Italy, Russia, and Brazil; a "making of" documentary; and a music video for the song "Keravnos Kivernitos". A music video was also made for the song "Enuma Elish".

In 2007, Theogonia won the Metal Storm award for Best Black Metal Album.

Track listing
All songs written by Sakis Tolis.
 "Χάος Γένετο (The Sign of Prime Creation)" – 3:20
 "Keravnos Kivernitos" – 4:41
 "Nemecic" – 4:16
 "Enuma Elish" – 4:39
 "Phobos' Synagogue" – 4:31
 "Gaia Tellus" – 4:39
 "Rege Diabolicus" – 2:52
 "He, the Aethyr" – 4:34
 "Helios Hyperion" – 3:50
 "Threnody" – 5:19

Credits
Sakis Tolis – vocals, guitar, keyboards 
Giorgos Bokos – guitar  
Andreas Lagios – bass 
Themis Tolis – drums

References

2007 albums
Rotting Christ albums
Season of Mist albums